Hotel Central is an 11-storey hotel on Avenida de Almeida Ribeiro in Sé, Macau. Historically it has also been known as President Hotel. The building was 6 storeys tall in 1928 but, after 5 more floors were added in 1942, became the tallest building in Macau. There were formerly casinos on the fifth and seventh floors of the building. It is also the first building in Macau with elevators.

References

Hotels in Macau
Landmarks in Macau
Hotel buildings completed in 1928